The 1991 Pilkington Glass Championships was a women's tennis tournament played on grass courts at the Devonshire Park Lawn Tennis Club in Eastbourne in the United Kingdom that was part of Tier II of the 1991 WTA Tour. The tournament was held from 17 June until 22 June 1991.

Finals

Singles
 Martina Navratilova defeated  Arantxa Sánchez Vicario 6–4, 6–4
 It was Navratilova's fourth singles title of the year and the 144th of her career.

Doubles
 Larisa Savchenko-Neiland /  Natalia Zvereva defeated  Gigi Fernández /  Jana Novotná 2–6, 6–4, 6–4
 It was Savchenko's fifth doubles title of the year and the 23rd of her career. It was Zvereva's fourth doubles title of the year and the 14th of her career.

References

External links
 ITF tournament edition details
 Tournament draws

Pilkington Glass Championships
Eastbourne International
Pilkington Glass Championships
Pilkington Glass Championships
1991 in English tennis